Ravi Basrur is an Indian music composer, sound designer, lyricist and director who mostly works in the Kannada film industry.

He is most known for his collaborations with director Prashant Neel, with whom he debuted in Ugramm. His work on the K.G.F. film series, also directed by Neel, earned him acclaim. He also works as a film director, having directed the films Gargar Mandala and Girmit.

Early life 
He is a native of Kundapura, a coastal town in Karnataka state. Born in Basrur Village, the coastal state of Karnataka on 01 Jan 1984 with the name Kiran, Ravi Basrur was from a poor family with 3 siblings (2 elder brothers and an elder sister). Ravi always was surrounded by music in his village. He was also from a family with a musical background where his uncle had an orchestra. Yakshagana, Temple Bhajanas was always around as his native is very well known for the same.

Struggle as a child 
Ravi had to see his joint family split at a very young age due to growing personal issues. His brother who was so far working in his uncle's orchestra was removed due to this. The circumstances at home made Ravi start supporting his family at a very young age (14 years). He started his own orchestra, he had also performed and worked on devotional songs for the next two years. His passion and inspiration towards music grew day by day and with the hunger to pursue his dream and passion, he left his village at the age of 17.

Struggle as a Teen 
Leaving his village at the age of 17 with 200 Rs in hand, Ravi came to Bangalore and joined an art academy in Bidadi. He got trained in carving stone and wood sculptures. He also met a couple of people from the film fraternity during this time. Post his training in Bidadi, Ravi moved to Bangalore and worked in carving sculptures for idols during the day to earn his daily bread and butter and during the night he used to visit people looking for an opportunity to kick-start his musical career.

Struggle as an Adult 
He always had support from his brothers and they always used to send him money for travelling and music-related activities. Ravi has initially recorded a devotional song and he made Archana Udupa sing the same. But he had no money to print the CDs and release them. He sold his only keyboard for money and used it to release the album CDs. Later he was blank and did not know what to do. He had no instruments, but the hunger for learning grew more and more with time. He meets Solomon and realises the technological growth in the music industry and he finally bought himself a computer with all his savings. He spent almost 1yr in his learning and built a small studio for himself in his village. He had done the studio with the hope that he would get into the cinema industry with the film that was about to take off. But due to unfortunate circumstances, the movie did not take off.

His Life in Mumbai 
Mumbai is a dream city for all those who want to enter the film industry. It is a city with a bundle of talents and a city that never sleeps. With lots of dreams in mind and aspirations to start his musical journey, Ravi moved to Mumbai. He spent around 1-1.5 years in this city.

He would do sculpting work during the day. It was the only source of income to lead his daily life. During the night he used to roam around the city looking out for an opportunity to play music in pubs and bars in the hope to find his chance in the film industry.

After almost a year, he went to a pub in Andheri East with the help of a common friend. Surprisingly the pub owner was also looking for a musician to play in his pub who is from the same village. The owner asked him to join from Monday and promised food, stay and other salary discussions.

Ravi bloomed with joy thinking finally his time had come and expected a good start, resigned from his sculpting work and left to start his journey towards music. His long-lost childhood dreams were finally about to come true for playing all the musical instruments.

The Lost Train 
The next day Ravi was supposed to leave for Andheri East through a local train. He had packed all his clothes and his musical instruments along with him. Unfortunately, it was not his day. On the other side of the story, there was a massive train bomb blast on the same day in Mumbai and the panic around this incident was real..

There was no way for him to reach Andheri East. He did not even have the option to show up to his earlier employer asking for the job. Nothing running in his mind, no clue on where to go, what to do. Ravi was dumbstruck for a moment. With no money in his hand, he did not even know how to reach back to his village. In the huge city of Mumbai, Ravi sat cluelessly and alone.

He somehow made up his mind to return to his village and left for Thane railway station. When he was about to reach the station, the police held him for checking. Looking at Ravi's appearance and a huge bag that he was carrying, the police started questioning aggressively about his ware bouts and what he was up to in the station. Though he tried explaining to the police about him being a musician and his musical instruments, the police were in no mood to listen and right in front of his eyes one of the police broke all of Ravi's instruments (Keyboard, Tabla). The policeman had no ears to whatever was being said and he very rudely broke all of Ravi's instruments.

The policeman did not just break the instruments but also all of Ravi's dreams and passion for music. Ravi was shattered that day to see a horrific incident happen in front of him and was all in tears. He wishes that no other musician should have to face such a situation in his life. He then managed to reach the train and he went and sat in the bathroom as he had no money left to even get himself a ticket. He did not open the bathroom till he reached Basrur and was weeping all day. In the fear of getting caught in the Basrur station for travelling without a ticket, he got down in the previous junction and called up his brother for help.

Return home 
After reaching home, Ravi faced a lot of backlash for his decision to pursue his dream of joining the cinema and creating music. He was even forced to join back to the family business and leave his music aside. With no luck by his side and increasing debt, and his family not wanting to see him struggle anymore, Ravi was left alone and was clueless about his life. The thought of him not being able to achieve his dream started haunting him. He knew that he would not be able to pursue his dream if he continued to work like every other man. He understood that no man but himself will have to stand by him during these tough times.

The words and pressure to come out of debt had made him think of all possible negative decisions. He had a debt of 2 lakhs to clear and the banks were sending notices to his home. All that was running on his mind was to come out of the debt and start a fresh one. Under this pressure, he decided to sell this kidney to pay his debts. He went to the newly opened hospital in his village to enquire about it. He even got a call back from the hospital on the opening for donation. Without saying anything at home, Ravi left for the hospital.

Ravi was made to prep for the operations and all the markings required were done too. When there was very little time left for him to enter the operation theatre, something just did not feel right. By god's grace, Ravi realized his mistake and left the hospital. Situations might lead one to take the wrong step, but Ravi gained back his strength, started believing in himself and was all set to start afresh.

From there he decides to return to Bangalore. When Ravi thought that all his problems will be solved and will start his career soon, life played its own game on him. His very own friend with whom he shared his room, sends him out and Ravi is left with no money and now no place to stay as well. He used to live in a public toilet in Govindraj Nagar for almost 2 months and had made a note of the temples and the time at which Prasadam will be distributed in each temple. He used to rely on the temple prasadam to fill his stomach every day. The thought of “Maybe this world is not the right place for me” was a constant thought for him during those times.

The Guiding Force 
People say with patience and perseverance anything can be achieved. And when the right time comes, things will automatically fall into place and the world will lead you to your destination. The same magic happened to Ravi as well.

One fine day when Ravi was around Avenue Road he met a person named M.K. Kamath who took him to a face reader. What happened next was a shock to Ravi and Kamath as well. The face reader's words were the least that Ravi had expected. Quoting the face readers’ words “There’ll come a time when we’ll have to meet him with an appointment. He’ll reach greater heights”. The face reader then starts conversing with Ravi asking about his aspirations and to which Ravi mentions that he wanted to buy a keyboard and start his career in music. The face reader without a second thought took 35k cash from his treasure box and handed it over to Ravi.

Everyone in this world needs a guiding force, a final push when he/she has given up on the world. The face reader turned out to be a great push of strength to Ravi. He then realised that there are good people in this world too. All it takes is a pure soul to see talents and identify them.

Ravi originally known as Kiran then changed his name to Ravi Basuru. “Ravi” as a tribute to the face reader who changed his life, “Basrur” as his journey started from there.

The Road to Destiny 
One fine day, from his RJ friend, Ravi got an opportunity to create jingles for Big Fm 92.7 for 2 days. Being impressed by his music, Binoy Joseph, then leading the FM station, provided him with a job as an Audio editor with a salary of 15000/-. From a guy who never knew what salary meant, earning 15k was huge for Basrur and was one step for him in pursuing his passion. He gave his heart out and was able to get 3 increments within a year. It is always important for someone to get recognition for the smaller talents he says.

From his recognition in the Big FM, he made his start in the Kannada film industry as a programmer (producer). He also worked under various music directors and gained music knowledge.

Though he had done multiple films earlier, Ugram movie gave him the break he needed and it was also a dream later on. With the mantra "Never expect anything from the work you do and give your best", his dedication and passion drew him to the place he is today. He has made his mark not only in the Kannada film industry but his music is now grove to many worldwide.

He believes and dreams to provide the right recognition and platform to the budding talents and is now a role model to thousands of budding musicians. Basur is a well-known music director, director, actor and also a singer in Karnataka film Industry, He has also worked in the Tamil and Telugu industry.

Career 
He debuted by scoring music for the film Ugramm. Following his debut, Basrur composed music  for films such as Ekka Saka (2015), Just Maduveli (2015), Karvva (2016), K.G.F: Chapter 1 (2018) and K.G.F: Chapter 2 (2022).

Ravi's first release as a music director was Ugramm (2014), for which he won the Zee Music Award and the KIMA International Award for Best Background Score. He was also nominated for a Filmfare Awards South award for Best Music Director for this film. He won the 'Best Playback singer' for Anjaniputra (2018) at SIIMA. He further achieved acclaim and widespread fame for his music in the K.G.F. films. His upcoming projects include the Prashant Neel directorial Salaar and Salman Khan's Kisi Ki Bhai Kisi Ki Jaan.

Discography

As music composer

As singer

As director

Accolades

References

External links
 

1983 births
Living people
21st-century Indian film directors
Kannada film directors
Kannada film score composers
People from Udupi district
Film directors from Karnataka
Telugu film score composers
South Indian International Movie Awards winners